Pseudepipona is a genus of potter wasps found in the Palearctic, Nearctic, Afrotropical and Australian regions.

Species
The following is a selection of some of the species are currently classified as members of the genus Pseudepipona:

Pseudepipona aborigena Borsato, 2005
Pseudepipona alaris (Saussure, 1853)
Pseudepipona angulata (Saussure, 1856)
Pseudepipona angusta (Saussure, 1863)
Pseudepipona ankarensis Giordani Soika, 1970
Pseudepipona aspra Giordani Soika, 1962
Pseudepipona atlantica Giordani Soika, 1969
Pseudepipona augusta (Moravitz, 1867)
Pseudepipona aurantiopilosella (Giordani Soika, 1962)
Pseudepipona beckeri (Moravitz, 1867)
Pseudepipona bicolor (Saussure, 1855)
Pseudepipona cherkensis Giordani Soika, 1942
Pseudepipona cretensis Blüthgen 1941
Pseudepipona clypalaris Giordani Soika, 1962
Pseudepipona derufata Blüthgen, 1951
Pseudepipona flava Giordani Soika, 1993
Pseudepipona gineri (Schulthess, 1934)
Pseudepipona herrichii (Saussure, 1856)
Pseudepipona inexpectata Blüthgen, 1955
Pseudepipona ionia Saussure, 1855
Pseudepipona lamellifera Giordani Soika, 1987
Pseudepipona lativentris (Saussure, 1855)
Pseudepipona niveopicta Giordani Soika, 1970
Pseudepipona oasis Giordani Soika, 1958
Pseudepipona pallida Giordani Soika, 1977
Pseudepipona peculiaris (Moravitz, 1895)
Pseudepipona priesneri Gusenleitner, 1970
Pseudepipona przewalskyi (Morawitz, 1885)
Pseudepipona pseudominuta]] Gusenleitner, 1971
Pseudepipona sellata (Moravitz, 1885)
Pseudepipona sessilis (Saussure 1853
Pseudepipona succincta (Saussure, 1853)
Pseudepipona tricarinata (Kokujev, 1912)
Pseudepipona tricolor Gusenleitner, 1976
Pseudepipona vicina Gusenleitner, 1972

References

Biological pest control wasps
Potter wasps